Platytes cerussella is a species of moth in the family Crambidae. It is found in almost all of Europe.

The wingspan is 12–16 mm. Males are darker in tone than females and usually slightly larger. Adults are usually flying in June and July.

The larvae feed on the roots of various plants growing under stones in sandy soil, including Carex arenaria, Festuca and other Gramineae species.

References

Moths described in 1775
Crambini
Moths of Europe